The Embassy of Greece in Ireland is the diplomatic mission of Greece in Ireland. It is located in the capital of Ireland, Dublin.

History
Greece established diplomatic relations with Ireland in 1975, and opened its embassy in Dublin in 1977.

Building
The Greek embassy is located within Dublin's Georgian core on Pembroke Road, close to Fitzwilliam Square, one of Dublin's Georgian Garden squares.

The embassy is situated in a four-storey over basement terraced-townhouse, which was built , and retains its original redbrick façade

See also
 Foreign relations of Ireland
 List of diplomatic missions in Ireland

References

Greece
Dublin
Greece–Ireland relations
1977 establishments in Ireland